Angela Malik, (born 3 December 1971) is an Indian chef, entrepreneur and food consultant. 
A businesswoman who built a deli business (now defunct) and multi-site Asian cookery school, The Angela Malik School of Food and Wine, Malik originally trained at Leiths School of Food and Wine and gained chef experience at London restaurants Bibendum and Vong.

She is programme director of contract caterers, Gather & Gather and is a member of Les Dames d’Escoffier, global network of women leaders and professionals in the fields of food, fine beverage and hospitality.

In 2017 Malik was appointed to the London Food Board in 2017, advising Mayor Sadiq Khan on food issues across the capital and how to develop a better food system for all Londoners, and helping develop a new London Food Strategy.

Malik was a finalist of the search for a British female chef by the TV show The F-Word on Channel 4. She also won the Daily Mail's 'Best exotic cookery course' for 2007/8.[1] She is a regular panellist on BBC Radio 4’s The Kitchen Cabinet  and has made guest TV appearances on Channel 4’s Sunday Brunch, ITV's This Morning and Kirstie Allsopp’s Homemade Christmas.

References

Living people
Scottish chefs
1971 births
Women chefs
Indian emigrants to Scotland
Alumni of the University of Edinburgh